Filotas (before 1927: Τσαλτζιλάρ - Tsaltzilar; , Chaldzhievo) is a village and a former municipality in Florina regional unit, West Macedonia, Greece. Since the 2011 local government reform it is part of the municipality Amyntaio, of which it is a municipal unit. The municipal unit has an area of 132.495 km2. Population 4,524 (2011).

Demographics
The Greek census (1920) recorded 2,137 people in the village and in 1923 there were 2,100 inhabitants who were Muslim. 
Following the Greek-Turkish population exchange, in 1926 within Tsaltzilar there were refugee families from East Thrace (393), Asia Minor (60) and the Caucasus (106). The Greek census (1928) recorded 1893 village inhabitants. There were 539 refugee families (2,188 people) in 1928.

References

Populated places in Florina (regional unit)
Former municipalities in Western Macedonia
Amyntaio